The Cleveland Shale, also referred to as the Cleveland Member, is a shale geologic formation in the eastern United States.

Identification and name 
The Cleveland Shale was identified in 1870 and named for the city of Cleveland, Ohio.
John Strong Newberry, director of the Ohio State Geological Survey, first identified the formation in 1870. He called it the "Cleveland Shale" and designated its type locality at Doan Brook near Cleveland. Details of the type locality and of stratigraphic nomenclature for this unit as used by the U.S. Geological Survey are available on-line at the National Geologic Map Database.

Description 

The primary minerals in the Cleveland Shale are chlorite, illite, pyrite, and quartz. Underground, the Cleveland Shale is black, dull grayish-black, bluish-black, or brownish-black in color. In exposed outcrops, it weathers to red, reddish-brown, or medium brown. Highly weathered rock turns gray. It is fairly fissile, breaking into thin, irregularly shaped sheets or flakes that occasionally display crystals of pickeringite. Relieved of stress once exposed, the Cleveland Shale is nonplastic and can appear as if fragmented into blocks due to jointing.

Pyrite basal boundary 
There is a sharp and clear distinction between the Cleveland Shale and underlying Chagrin Shale. At the very bottom of the Cleveland Shale there is a thin, discontinuous layer of pyrite. This pyrite layer is discontinuous because after this rock was laid down, it was eroded. The erosion increases as one moves south along the valley of the Cuyahoga River and east to the Grand River. Portions of the pyrite layer, known as Skinner's Run Bed, contain fragments of petrified wood and fossilized fish bones worn smooth by the action of water. Above the pyrite layer, a limestone layer is found in west-central (but not eastern) Ohio.

The remainder of the Cleveland Shale generally consists of a relatively hard, organic rich oil shale. It has both an upper and lower part.

Lower part 
A clay shale, described as bluish or bluish-gray and as olive-black to brownish-black, forms the lower part. The lower part can be anywhere from a few inches to several feet in thickness. This layer is sometimes referred to as the Olmstead shale. This layer has been dated to between 362.6 and 361.0 million years old based on conodont biozones (Bispathodus aculeatus aculeatus to Bispathodus ultimus ultimus zones). Thin beds of gray or brown siltstone, lumps of pyrite, and layers of silica-heavy limestone with cone-in-cone structures are found in the lower part. In eastern Ohio, thin gray veins ("stringers") of siltstone appear. In western Ohio, the Cleveland Shale appears to interbed with the Chagrin Shale below it, erasing the clear boundary between the two rock formations.

Upper part 
The upper part of the Cleveland Shale is a black to brownish black silty shale with occasional thin beds of gray shale and siltstone. The upper part is much richer in petroleum and kerogen. When broken open, fresh samples smell like crude oil. Where the upper part is thick, and particularly in northeast Ohio, the shale has a distinctive "rippled" appearance. The upper  of the Cleveland Shale contains abundant nodules of phosphate, nodules and bands (extremely thin beds) of pyrite, bands of calcisiltite, and lamination. Almost no concretions are found in the upper part.

Geographic extent 

The Cleveland Shale is a shale geologic formation in Ohio in the United States.
The Cleveland Shale underlies much of northeast Ohio in beds of varying thickness.

In northeast Ohio, the member does not appear east of the Grand River.
It is thickest around the Rocky River north of Berea, Ohio, and thins to the east, west, and south. 

The Cleveland Shale is found in east-central Kentucky.

The unit is also present in West Virginia and in southwest Virginia, where it is mapped as the Cleveland Member of the Ohio Shale.

Stratigraphic Setting 
The Cleveland Shale (or Cleveland Member) is a sub-unit of the Ohio Shale Formation. The Chagrin Shale underlies the Cleveland Shale. The Bedford Shale generally overlies the Cleveland Shale, with a sharp distinction between the two. In places, red and grey shale may intertongue (interlock) with the Cleveland Shale extensively. In some areas, the Cleveland Shale is described as overstepped or unconformably overlaid gradationally by Berea Siltstone and sharply by Berea Sandstone.

It is the regional equivalent of the Hangenberg Black Shale and the Bakken Shale.

Fossils 
Exceptional marine animal fossils are found in the formation. The Cleveland Shale is generally considered to be fossil-poor, but there are exceptions. The basal pyrite layer contains petrified wood and fossilized fish bones. The lower part is famous for its extensive and well-preserved fossil Chondrichthyans (including Cladoselache), Conodonts, Placodermi, and palaeoniscinoids ray-finned fishes. The giant predatory placoderms Dunkleosteus terrelli, Gorgonichthys clarki, Gymnotrachelus hydei, Heintzichthys gouldii, and five subspecies (including the type specimen) of Titanichthys were all discovered in the Cleveland Shale. The Cleveland Shale is classified as a konservatte-lagerstatten, which means it often preserves complete body fossils. Typical early shark preservation includes soft tissue outlines and impressions, fin rays, gill musculature, cartilage, and stomach contents. Placoderms in the Cleveland Shale typically do not show any good soft-tissue preservation.

Faunal list follows Carr and Jackson (2008) and Carr 2018

Placodermi

Chondrichthyes

Osteichthyans

Age 
The Cleveland Shale is approximately 362.6 to 360.1 million years old, daing to the very latest part of the Devonian period, the Fammenian, based on biostratigraphy from conodonts and plant spores. The Cleveland Shale extends all the way to the Hangenberg mass extinction that ended the Devonian but does not reach the very end of the Devonian period. Unlike the Permian-Triassic extinction and Cretaceous-Paleogene extinction the Devonian-Carboniferous boundary does not correlate with the mass extinction event at the end of this period. The Bedford Shale and Berea Sandstone represent Devonian layers that post-date the Devonian-Carboniferous extinction but were deposited on top of the Cleveland Shale, and encompass some of the recovery fauna otherwise typical of the Carboniferous in the aftermath of the Hangenberg Event.

The upper 2.5 m of the Cleveland Shale has been chemostratigraphically correlated with the Hangenberg Event and the type stratigraphy in Germany, suggesting that the Cleveland Shale preserves the second of the two mass extinction events that together comprise the late Devonian extinction

Interpretation of depositional environments 
The Cleveland Shale is likely the regional expression of the Dasberg event, a major extinction event that occurred near the end of the Devonian period. 
The Cleveland Shale is interpreted as having accumulated in an anaerobic environment. Evidence exists to suggest that the Cleveland Shale was laid down during the Dasberg event, an Upper Famennian extinction event that devastated land-based flora and marine-based fauna. This led to a significant drop in marine oxygen (an anoxic event) and atmospheric carbon dioxide,
and then a brief glaciation. The global environment recovered, only to suffer another extinction, the Hangenberg event, close to the Devonian-Carboniferous boundary. While the Cleveland Shale was being deposited, extensive organic matter from the land was swept into the sea then lying over Ohio. Although there is dispute over how deep this sea was, the Dasberg event meant that oceans could support few to no bottom-dwelling animals. This explains why the Cleveland Shale largely lacks fossils of benthic organisms and has a high carbon content that colors the shale very dark gray to black.

The contact between the Chagrin Shale and Cleveland Shale has been described as interbedding. This feature is interpreted as having been caused when two different depositional environments (in this case, the oxygenated sea which laid down the Chagrin Shale and the anaerobic sea rich in organic matter which laid down the Cleveland Shale) moved repeatedly back and forth over the same area. Geologist Horace R. Collins called the boundary area intercalated, but it is unclear what meaning he intended.

Different hypotheses have been suggested as the cause of the regional, irregular contact between the Cleveland Shale and Bedford Formation. Charles E.B. Conybeare has noted that the Cleveland Shale is siltier in the east and more calcareous in the west. He hypothesized that this indicates that silt flowed into the sea from east to west. Current eroded the Cleveland Shale and then laid down new sediment in the gullies which became the Bedford Formation. Jack C. Pashin and Frank R. Ettensohn proposed a variation on this hypothesis. They note that the region containing the Cleveland Shale was undergoing uplift when the Bedford Formation was being deposited. This likely led to exposure and erosion of the Cleveland Shale, with sediment which became the Bedford Formation filling in these gullies. They also observe that there is evidence of diapirism (the intrusion of deformable Cleveland Shale upward into the more brittle Bedford Formation), as well as intertonguing. Baird et al. note that the Cleveland Shale also tilts downward to the south. They suggest that this caused overstepping, rather than intertonguing.

Economic geology 
The high organic content of the Cleveland Shale makes it eminently suitable for the formation of fossil fuels. The Cleveland Shale also contains cannel coal and "true" coal, although neither in great quantity.

See also 

 List of fossiliferous stratigraphic units in Ohio
 Marcellus Formation
 Escuminac Formation
 Floresta Formation
 Hunsrück Slate
 Rhynie Chert
 Gogo Formation
 Late Devonian extinction event

References 
Notes

Citations

Bibliography 

Geologic formations of Ohio
Geologic formations of Kentucky
Devonian System of North America
Famennian Stage
Devonian Ohio
Devonian Kentucky
Shale formations of the United States
Open marine deposits
Source rock formations
Formations
Devonian southern paleotemperate deposits
Lagerstätten
Fossiliferous stratigraphic units of North America
Paleontology in Ohio